Arthur Pearson  (31 January 1897 – 14 October 1980) was a Labour Party politician in the United Kingdom. Pearson was one of eight children of William and Margaret (Lewis) Pearson, natives of Saltney, Flintshire.

Pearson worked as a chainworker at the Brown, Lennox and Co. at Pontypridd, where his father had also worked, from 1913 until 1938. In 1920, he was elected treasurer of the local branch of the Chainworkers Association, and in 1934 was runner-up in the ballot for the position of national secretary of the association. During the First World War, he served with the Welsh Guards from 1916 until 1919. In 1924 he was elected secretary of the Pontypridd UDC Labour group even before his election as a member of the council.

Pearson was a member of the Pontypridd Urban District Council from 1926 until 1938, representing the Trallwn ward. He served as chairman in 1937–38. In 1928 he was elected as a member of Glamorgan County Council for the Cilfynydd ward, defeating long-serving Liberal Alderman William Roberts Davies, who had been a member since 1898. He remained a member until 1945. In 1933-34 he was chairman of the Pontypridd Education Committee, and he became a JP in 1939.

Following the death of the Member of Parliament (MP) for Pontypridd, David Lewis Davies in 1937, Pearson was selected as the new Labour candidate, narrowly defeating local miners' agent W.H. May at a selection meeting at Pontyclun on 15 January 1938. Following his victory at the 1938 by-election, and served until his retirement at the 1970 general election. He was a government whip as  Comptroller of the Household from 1945 to 1946, and Treasurer of the Household from 1946 until 1951. He was appointed CBE in the 1980 Birthday Honours.

Arthur Pearson was unmarried.

References

Sources

Online

External links 

 

1897 births
1980 deaths
Commanders of the Order of the British Empire
Ministers in the Attlee governments, 1945–1951
Treasurers of the Household
UK MPs 1935–1945
UK MPs 1945–1950
UK MPs 1950–1951
UK MPs 1951–1955
UK MPs 1955–1959
UK MPs 1959–1964
UK MPs 1964–1966
UK MPs 1966–1970
Welsh Labour Party MPs
Welsh justices of the peace
People from Saltney